Jimmy Callahan (Philadelphia, Pennsylvania, June 16, 1891 – September 21, 1957, Belleville, New Jersey) was an American actor who made several silent comedy short films in the 1920s.

Filmography
Jimmy's Last Night Out (1921) 
The Stowaway (1921) 
Props (1921) 
Wild Women (1921) 
A Lucky Dog (1925) 
October Morn (1925) 
A Wonderful Wallop (1925) 
The Huckleberry Gulch (1925) 
A One Man Woman (1925) 
The Poor Millionaire (1925) 
On the Isle of Sap (1925) 
A Tough Night (1925) 
His Future Father-in-Law (1925)

References

External links

1891 births
1957 deaths
American male silent film actors
20th-century American male actors
Male actors from Philadelphia